DePierre v. United States, 564 U.S. 70 (2011), was a case in which the Supreme Court of the United States held that the use of the term "cocaine base" in 21 U.S.C. § 841(b)(1) refers to cocaine in its chemically basic form. The decision of the Court was unanimous, except with respect to Part III–A.

Background
A federal court found Frantz DePierre guilty of distributing cocaine in April 2008. Additionally, DePierre was found guilty of distributing more than 50 grams of "cocaine base, which carries a 10-year minimum sentence." Following this conviction, DePierre was sentenced to 10 years in a federal prison followed by 5 years of supervised release. Two years later, the US Court of Appeals upheld the sentencing,

Question Before the Court
Does the term "cocaine base" cover a broad spectrum of cocaine defined chemically as a base, or is the term specifically limited to the use and distribution of "crack" cocaine?

Decision of the Court
In a unanimous decision, Justice Sotomayor wrote the opinion of the Court defining cocaine base as not just crack cocaine, but any substance that contains "cocaine in its chemically basic form."

Concurring Opinion

Justice Scalia wrote a brief, humorous concurring opinion arguing that the Court's look into legislative history is unneeded and potentially harmful.

See also 
 Cocaine in the United States

References

External links
 

United States controlled substances case law
2011 in United States case law
United States Supreme Court cases
United States Supreme Court cases of the Roberts Court
Cocaine in the United States